Leccinum griseum is a common, edible mushroom in the genus Leccinum. It is found below hornbeam, usually in small groups. Young mushrooms with firm flesh are very palatable.

Description
The cap is convex, usually greyish brown but can be light brown to olive. It grows up to 15 cm in diameter. The stem is pale grey, rather long and slender with longitudinal furrows. The flesh is white, slowly turning grey-violet when cut, particularly in the stem, and it has a mild taste.

References

E. Garnweidner. Mushrooms and Toadstools of Britain and Europe. Collins. 1994.

External links

griseum
Fungi of Europe
Edible fungi